General Gagan Singh Bhandari (sinjhapati) (Nepali: गगनसिंह)(1796-1846) was a Nepalese General. He was born in a chettri family of Gorkha Kingdom. He was the commander-in-chief of the most powerful party headed by Queen Rajya Lakshmi Devi, the favourite wife of King Rajendra Bir Bikram Shah Dev. She was anxious to secure the crown for her own son, and meantime permanent regency for herself. At the height of his power during 1845, general Gagan Singh controlled seven regiments in the army compared to only three by the prime minister Fateh Jung Shah, making him the one holding the real power behind the throne of Nepal.  His notorious affair with the queen also made him an object of jealousy and dislike to the king and the royal family.  Little is known about his early days.  He was shot to death from behind while offering evening prayers at his private temple on the night of September 14, 1846.  His assassination remains mysterious, and is considered by historians as one of the untold stories which led to a turnaround of events in the History of Nepal, and eventually the establishment of the Rana dynasty.

Massacre
Raged by the news of her beloved and trustworthy general, Queen Rajya Lakshmi Devi vowed to punish the culprit. She immediately ordered all the noblemen and parties for an emergency inquiry. This gathering followed one of the worst massacres in the history of Nepal, called the Kot Massacre of September 14, 1846 that catapulted the Ranas into power. The queen suspected Bir Keshar Pande for the killing of her secret lover and ordered Abhiman Singh Rana Magar, the then Commander-in-chief of Nepal Army, to kill the Pande leader. However, having known the real culprit, he hesitated in doing so. Fighting broke out in the crowd, and he was wounded by a shot at his chest by Jung Bahadur Rana. The dying General Abhiman Singh Rana Magar, shouted, "Junge was the killer of Gagan Singh"("गगन सिंहको हत्त्यारा जंगे नै हो").

During the free-for-all that followed, swords and knives were used on all sides. Through some scheme that has never been explained adequately, the only leader with organized bodies of troops in the kot area was Jang Bahadur, whose troops suppressed the fighting, killing many of his opponents in the process. When the struggle subsided, the courtyard was strewn with the bodies of dozens of leading nobles and an unknown number of their followers The Pande and Thapa families in particular were devastated during this slaughter. That followed a seek and destroy approach taken by Jung Bahadur Rana against all nobles in the royal house and other in the country, that included many ethnic leaders as well.

Sources
 https://archive.today/20130410010212/http://66.7.193.115/news-analysis-and-views/possibility-of-rise-of-jang-bahadur-in-nepal
 https://web.archive.org/web/20050308064007/http://www.dilliramanregmi.org/century/chapter2.html
 http://www.country-data.com/cgi-bin/query/r-9065.html

1846 deaths
Nepalese generals
Nepalese politicians
Year of birth unknown
19th-century Nepalese nobility
Nepalese Hindus